is a Japanese voice actress affiliated with Axl-One.

Filmography

Television animation
 2014
 Glasslip as Tōko Fukami
 HappinessCharge PreCure! as Female student (ep 16), Alo-Alo (ep 28), Mao's friend, Cure Shelly
The Irregular at Magic High School as Third High School Student
 Locodol as Manami Kurohime (eps 11-12)
Magimoji Rurumo as Schoolgirl
Persona 4: The Golden Animation as Schoolgirl B
 2015
 Assassination Classroom as Schoolgirl (ep 5)
Concrete Revolutio as Rose (ep 11)
Ketsuekigata-kun! 2 as Female student
Miss Monochrome: The Animation 3 as Magical girl (ep 11), Female guest (ep 12)
2016
Sekkō Boys as High school girl, Beautiful woman (ep 6)
Concrete Revolutio: The Last Song as Rose
Kabaneri of the Iron Fortress as Hatsune (ep 2)
Naria Girls as Urara
2017
A Centaur's Life as Himeno Kimihara
2018
Ongaku Shōjo as Hanako Yamadaki
2021
Super Cub as Female student
2023
Hoshikuzu Telepath as Yū Akeuchi

Theatrical animation
 2014
 Eiga HappinessCharge Pretty Cure! Ningyō no Kuni no ballerina as Tsumugi's Friend B
2016
Digimon Adventure tri.- Chapter 2: 
Determination
Digimon Adventure tri.- Chapter 3: Confession

Video games
 2015
 Granado Espada  as Anisse
 School Fanfare

 2016
Grimms Notes as Hagoromo Tennyo
 SA7 SILENT ABILITY SEVEN as Chiharu Naruse

 2018
 The Idolmaster Cinderella Girls as Hinako Kita

Radio
Glasslip ~ Kazemichiradio ~ (HiBiKi Radio Station: June 30, 2014 - October 13, 2014)
A & G NEXT BREAKS FIVE STARS (chō! A & G+: April 6, 2015 – present (Tuesday personality) )

Dubbing roles

Film
 Big Eyes as Lily
 Luna Petunia as Luna

References

External links 
 Official agency profile 
 

1995 births
Living people
People from Tokyo
Japanese voice actresses